Katie Eberling (born August 7, 1988) is an American bobsledder.

References

External links
 

1988 births
Living people
American female bobsledders
Sportspeople from Cook County, Illinois
People from Palos Hills, Illinois
21st-century American women